Studio N is a subsidiary of Webtoon Entertainment Inc. launched in August 2018 that produces drama films and television series based on stories from their Korean library of webtoons and web novels. The subsidiary is headed by Kwon Mi-kyung, who was a former head of the film business division of CJ ENM. Kwon describes the studio as a "IP bridge company that collaborates with existing film and drama production companies".

Dramas include Hell Is Other People, broadcast on OCN; and Pegasus Market, broadcast on tvN.

Works

TV series

Films

Notes

References

External links 
 

Naver Corporation
Television production companies of South Korea
Film production companies of South Korea
Mass media companies established in 2018
South Korean companies established in 2018